The Australian Moment: How We Were Made For These Times is a 2012 Australian economics book by George Megalogenis. It explains how Australia has been able to weather recent world economic problems relatively unscathed.

Reception
Dennis Altman, writing in The Sydney Morning Herald, described The Australian Moment as "a detailed and rather economist account of mainstream politics during the past 40 years.", and although calling Megalogenis "one of the country's sanest political journalists" found that "in the end his views reflect the dominant consensus of the chattering classes: Hawke is the best post-Menzies leader because he led the way in deregulating the economy.", and concluded "The thesis of The Australian Moment is fascinating, but it deserves a far more thought-through argument and one that recognises the equal claims of countries such as Brazil or Turkey that seem more likely than Australia to be seen as global models. .. It is unfortunate that there is not more time for our best journalists to step back, reflect more and write more slowly."

The Australian Moment has also been reviewed by The Spectator, Australian Book Review, Inside Story, Institute of Public Affairs Review, and Policy.

Awards
2012 Harry Williams Award - winner
2012 John Button Prize: for writing on policy and politics - shortlist
2012 Walkley Book Award - winner
2013 Prime Minister's Literary Award for Non-fiction - winner
2014 Adelaide Festival Award for Literature: Non-fiction - shortlist

Adaptation
Making Australia Great: Inside Our Longest Boom is a 2015 3 part documentary by Megalogenis based on The Australian Moment.

References

2012 non-fiction books
Australian non-fiction books
Books about economic history
Penguin Books